Andrzej of Sprowa Odrowąż was a 15th-century Polish noble and statesman, starost of Ruthenia and Voivode of Podolia. He is best known as the founder of the Bernardine Church in Lwów.

Polish nobility
Polish Roman Catholics
Year of birth missing
Andrzej
Ruthenian nobility
1465 deaths